The second season of The Promised Neverland is a 2021 Japanese anime television series adapted from the manga series of the same name by Kaiu Shirai and illustrated by Posuka Demizu. It adapted the story arc "Promised Forest" (chapters 38–52) before turning towards an anime original direction starting within the beginning of "Search For Minerva" arc, all the while retaining a few themes and plot points of the original manga. On March 29, 2019, a second season was officially announced to be in production. The second season was originally set for an October 2020 release, but due to the COVID-19 pandemic, it was postponed to air from January 8 to March 26, 2021 on Fuji TV's Noitamina. The opening theme is  performed by  while the ending theme is  performed by Myuk.


Episode list

International broadcast
The series is available with multilingual subtitles on iQIYI in South East Asia, Hong Kong, Macau and Taiwan.
The series was also made available on Netflix on Late August of 2021.

Notes

References

External links

  
 
 
 

The Promised Neverland episode lists
2021 Japanese television seasons
Anime postponed due to the COVID-19 pandemic